Francis Russell may refer to:
Francis Russell (author) (1910–1989), American author 
Francis Russell (art historian), British art historian
Francis Russell, 2nd Earl of Bedford (c. 1527–1585), English nobleman, soldier and politician
Francis Russell (MP for Northumberland) (died 1585), MP for Northumberland, son of the above
Francis Russell, 4th Earl of Bedford (1587–1641), English politician
Sir Francis Russell, 2nd Baronet, of Chippenham (c. 1616–1664), Member of Parliament and a soldier for the parliamentary cause during the English Civil War
Sir Francis Russell, 2nd Baronet, of Wytley (1637–1706), Member of Parliament for Tewkesbury, 1673–1690
Francis Russell, Marquess of Tavistock (1739–1767), British politician and eldest son of the 4th Duke of Bedford
Francis Russell (solicitor) (1740–1795), secretary to the Duchy of Lancaster
Francis Russell, 5th Duke of Bedford (1765–1802), English aristocrat and Whig politician
Francis Russell, 7th Duke of Bedford (1788–1861), British peer and Whig politician
Francis Russell, 9th Duke of Bedford (1819–1891), English politician and agriculturalist
Francis H. Russell, American diplomat
Francis Russell (MP for Cheltenham), British cavalry Major-General and Member of Parliament for Cheltenham, 1895–1900
Francis William Russell (1800–1871), Member of the UK Parliament for Limerick City
Francis Albert Rollo Russell, son of John Russell, 1st Earl Russell and first person to be born to a sitting British prime minister

See also
Frank Russell (disambiguation)
Frances Russell (born 1941), author and journalist in Winnipeg, Canada
Frances Russell, Countess Russell, wife of the Prime Minister of the United Kingdom